"Ghost Town" is the fifth single by Shiny Toy Guns, and the second single from their second album Season of Poison. The single peaked at #26 on the Billboard Alternative Songs Chart.

Music video
Shot as an animated video, it starts with a capture of an abandoned placard, which read "Welcome to Ghost Town, Population Dead." The video then continues showing the band, all portrayed as cartoon characters, singing the song. While they invade the town with their out-loud performance, zombies are seen coming out of the ground. Nearing the end, all the ghosts, including all the band's members, disappear when struck with the sunlight. The music video was directed by Glen Hanson.

Usage in other media
It was remixed by American Drum and bass trio Evol Intent
It was featured on an episode of The CW's 90210
It was featured on the first episode of The CW's Hellcats
"Ghost Town" is performed by the Seattle Sounders FC marching band "Sound Wave"
"Ghost Town" is used when the Ottawa Senators score a goal
It was performed by the American Idol top 11 contestants in the Ford music video

References

Songs about cities
2009 singles
Shiny Toy Guns songs
2008 songs
Songs written by Gregori Chad Petree
Universal Motown Records singles
Songs written by Jeremy Dawson
Songs written by Sisely Treasure